"A Hard Day's Night" is the pilot episode of the American television medical drama Grey's Anatomy, which first aired on March 27, 2005 on ABC. The episode introduces main characters and surgical interns Meredith Grey, Cristina Yang, Izzie Stevens, Alex Karev and George O'Malley, who come face to face with what their future holds as they enter the realm of surgery at Seattle Grace Hospital. Other main characters include Derek Shepherd, Miranda Bailey, Richard Webber and Preston Burke.

The episode was watched by an American audience of 16.25 million, and received positive reviews from television critics.

Plot
This chronicles the first 48-hour shift for the new surgical interns. Meredith (Ellen Pompeo) meets Derek Shepherd (Patrick Dempsey), with whom she had a one-night stand the night before, and discovers he's the new attending and chief of neurosurgery at Seattle Grace, and also her "boss". All the interns are introduced to their resident in charge, Miranda Bailey (Chandra Wilson), nicknamed "The Nazi" for her serious demeanor and strictness. They are also introduced to the Chief of Surgery Richard Webber (James Pickens Jr.) and the head of cardiothoracic surgery Preston Burke (Isaiah Washington), who catches the eye of Cristina (Sandra Oh). Meredith has trouble with her first case, a teenage girl who's having unexplained seizures. Izzie (Katherine Heigl) dislikes Meredith, as she thinks she's trying to "get ahead" by sleeping with an attending surgeon; it is revealed Izzie had a past career as a model, which is how she put herself through medical school, and she is teased by Alex (Justin Chambers). George (T. R. Knight) earns the nickname "007" ("license to kill") after botching his first surgery, an appendectomy, when he inverted the stump and pulled too hard on the sutures, tearing the bowel (the patient was saved by Dr Burke).

Meredith is the daughter of acclaimed surgeon Ellis Grey (Kate Burton), who evidently had an affair with Richard years before, while married to Meredith's father, Thatcher. Ellis is now battling Alzheimer's disease and Meredith constantly and secretly visits her.

Production

The voice-over starting the episode did not originally appear in the episode; Rhimes said: "In the editing room, it felt like a piece was missing, so we added it."  Director Peter Horton had a different idea for the first shot of the series that he later regretted not using. While they did not have time and Rhimes wanted to "start with a bang", he stated: "My original opening for the pilot was Ellen lying naked on the couch. The opening scene of the pilot was Derek and Meredith having just slept together in a one-night stand. We had a very tight lens that was out of focus, going over all the curves of her body. You didn't even really know what it was as the credits were rolling. [Her body] would come into focus as her eyes opened. It was this beautiful description of Grey's Anatomy."

Stephen McPherson who was the president of ABC Entertainment division at the time had little faith in the pilot, and hated the title Grey's Anatomy. He requested it be titled Complications at one point. After the producers turned in the pilot, he shut production down. Future showrunner Krista Vernoff (then-staff writer) recalled twelve years later to The Hollywood Reporter: "He hated it. He said to [then ABC executive] Suzanne Patmore Gibbs (1967—2018) at the time, 'This show is going to be the chapter in my book titled "Why I Should Trust Myself or Why I Should Trust People I Hire."' Because she forced that program on the air. And then it was a great big hit, and he got all the credit."

However, Shonda Rhimes was able to make a point to production staff member and writer, Eric Buchman that Atul Gawande had written a book named Complications with a similar premise and worried about being accused of "baically stealing his book" as it revolved around a "young doctor working for a hospital for the first time". The network even optioned the book "just so that they could officially use the title," but Rhimes recalled not knowing who made the call to go back to the title Grey's Anatomy. Kate Burton who portrays Ellis Grey remembers that when she was called into audition for the role the working title was Surgeons. Buchman recalled someone pitching the title Miss Diagnosis to him, which Rhimes "just outright hated".

Casting
Justin Chambers was not included in the original pilot episode filmed in March 2004. Tony Phelan stated: "One of the notes after the pilot test was: "You need a bad boy. You need a male member of the intern class who's not just an asshole, but male". As a result, Phelan stated, "If you go back and watch the pilot, you can see how they surgically put Justin in everywhere." The character of Preston Burke was originally envisioned as a caucasian, to be played by Paul Adelstein, who starred in Grey's Anatomy spin-off Private Practice. However, due to his commitment to a film whose shooting dates changed, the actor had to drop out at the last moment and his character was rethought. Isaiah Washington was originally considered for the role of Derek Shepherd, which eventually went to Patrick Dempsey. Washington later received a callback from Rhimes to play Burke. He commented: "I knew I could never be wrong in my heart about something so good and so genuine. Her writing just seemed very complex, very honest." "I said that I would only do it if I didn't have to be like that guy on that other medical show who was always struggling with his anger."

Writer and later-showrunner Stacy McKee revealed the original script was an "unmakeable draft" and "too long", with Burke and Richard Webber at one point possibly being related. Originally, titular lead actress Ellen Pompeo was hesitant to do a medical drama. She said, "I hate medical shows! They make me think I'm gonna die all the time" but was encouraged to meet showrunner Shonda Rhimes for lunch at Barney Greengrass in Beverly Hills. After they met, Pompeo stated she liked her and trusted her vision.

Reception
ReviewStream.com gave positive reviews regarding the pilot episode, due to the undeniable chemistry between Ellen Pompeo and Patrick Dempsey from the series' first scene. Regarding Miranda Bailey's appearance in the pilot, ReviewStream.com stated "She's such a small woman but wait until she speaks". HomeTheaterInfo.com, however, had a mixed perspectives on the pilot, noting that the storylines were similar to fellow ABC series Desperate Housewives, but also "brilliantly written, extremely well acted and directed to near perfection". New York Daily News named Grey's Anatomy a "winner" in response to its first season, whereas Newsday expressed a positive opinion by stating "You simply can't stop watching."

References

External links
 

2005 American television episodes
Grey's Anatomy (season 1) episodes
American television series premieres